Alysia Montaño (née Johnson) (born 23 April 1986) is an American middle distance runner.  She is a six-time USA Outdoor Track and Field Championships 800 metres champion (2007, 2010, 2011, 2012, 2013 and 2015). She gained significant publicity for the 2014 race that she competed while 8 months pregnant.

Career
Alysia Johnson moved to California from New York when she was 3 years old. She played soccer and ran cross country through high school. She ran for Canyon High School in Santa Clarita, California, with her high school career culminating in winning the 800 meters at the CIF California State Meet in 2004.  That year she was ranked #10 in the nation and finished fourth at the Golden West Invitational, a meet that proclaims itself to be a National championship of High School Track and Field.

At the University of California, Berkeley, she continued to improve.  By 2006, she finished 3rd at the NCAA Women's Outdoor Track and Field Championships, setting personal bests three times during the competition.  2007 put her on the national stage, winning the NCAA Indoor Championship, the Outdoor Championship and breaking the 2 minute barrier.
	
At the 2007 USA Outdoor Track and Field Championships, Montaño won her first national title in the 800 m with a time of 1:59.47. At the 2007 World Athletics Championships, Montaño was eliminated in the heats of the 800 m by finishing 4th with a time of 2:02.11.

At the 2010 IAAF World Indoor Championships, Montaño won her first international medal, a bronze, in the 800 m, finishing with a personal best time of 1:59.60. At the 2011 USA Outdoor Track and Field Championships, Montaño won the 800 m title in a time of 1:58.33 to defend her 2010 crown. She placed fourth at that year's World Championships in Daegu with her second fastest time of 1:57.48 minutes.  As a result of the disqualification of several Russian competitors, she advanced to the bronze medal.

She came close to a personal best at the 2012 Prefontaine Classic, winning the 800 m in 1:57.37 minutes.  At the 2012 Olympics, the front running Montaño held the lead until the kickers ran past her in the closing stages of the race, ultimately holding on to fifth place.  With the potential disqualification of two Russian athletes, that could turn into an Olympic bronze medal.  With the disqualification of Mariya Savinova that has been elevated to fourth, however Ekaterina Poistogova was not disqualified backdated to the 2012 Olympics despite receiving a lifetime ban for doping.  That decision allowed Poistogova to advance to the silver medal and prevented Montaño from advancing further.

She won the 2013 Milrose Games 600 meters and set an American Indoor Record of 1:23.59 on 16 February.

Won 2013 Penn Relays 4 x 800 meters and set American Outdoor Record in 8:04.31 on 27 April. Lea Wallace (2:02.0), Brenda Martinez (2:00.6), Ajee' Wilson (2:03.1), Alysia Montano (1:58.6).  Again at the 2013 World Championships, Montaño finished fourth after leading and being passed in the closing stage of the race.  For the third major championship in a row, a Russian athlete, Mariya Savinova finished ahead of her.  With Savinova's lifetime ban for doping, this resulted into another bronze medal for Montaño when the medals were reallocated.

Alysia Montaño earned a silver medal at Athletics at the 2015 Pan American Games – Women's 800 metres in 1:59.76 the day after running a 50-point 400 meters relay leg in Athletics at the 2015 Pan American Games – Women's 4 × 400 metres relay.

Alysia Montaño did not qualify for the 2016 Rio de Janeiro Olympics after falling in the USA Olympic trial finals.

Major competition record

Personal bests
.

Racing while pregnant
Alysia garnered attention in June 2014 by competing in the USATF's USA Outdoor Track and Field Championships while eight months pregnant.  She finished last in a field of 29 in the 800 meters preliminaries with a time of 2:32.13.  She gave birth to Linnea Dori Montaño on 15 August 2014.

A year later in June 2015, Alysia returned and won the 800 meters final of the US Trials and qualified for the World Athletics Championships 2015 in Beijing.

References

External links 

 
 
 
 Cal athlete bio: Alysia Montaño
 Interview with Alysia Montano

1986 births
Living people
Sportspeople from Queens, New York
Track and field athletes from New York City
American female middle-distance runners
African-American female track and field athletes
Athletes (track and field) at the 2012 Summer Olympics
Olympic track and field athletes of the United States
Athletes (track and field) at the 2015 Pan American Games
Pan American Games gold medalists for the United States
Pan American Games silver medalists for the United States
Pan American Games medalists in athletics (track and field)
Track and field athletes from California
World Athletics Championships athletes for the United States
USA Outdoor Track and Field Championships winners
USA Indoor Track and Field Championships winners
Medalists at the 2015 Pan American Games
21st-century African-American sportspeople
21st-century African-American women
20th-century African-American people
20th-century African-American women